Callipogon lemoinei is a species of beetle of the genus Callipogon. The species was originally described by Louis Jérôme Reiche in 1840.

References

Taxa named by Louis Jérôme Reiche
Prioninae